Happy Mystery Child is the ninth studio album by Trisomie 21, a French electronic/coldwave group led by Hervé and Philippe Lomprez. Released by Le Marquis Records on December 11, 2004, the record marked the return of Trisomie 21 5 years after their prior studio album.

Track listing
Red or Green
She Died for Love (featuring Linda Lamb) 
No Search for Us
The Sweet Running Over
Come in Paradise
The Touch of Any Flame
No Works of Words
Personal  Feelings
Midnight of My Life
Forsaken Mysteries

Personnel
Philippe Lomprez: vocals
Hervé Lomprez: electronics - guitars - bass
Martin Blohorn: electronics
Bruno Objoie: electric guitars
Marco Palas: drums on "Forsaken Memories"
David Rubbio: 12-string guitar on "The Sweet Running Over"

References

2004 albums
Trisomie 21 albums